Ben Young (born 1973) is an Anglo-American artist based in London.

Young was born in Amersham, England, to an American mother and British father. His work draws in large part from graffiti and art informel to form a social commentary and visual analogue of the breakdown in hierarchies of perception in art, further blurring the perceived boundaries between so-called high-art and more demotic art forms such as street art.

Young received his MA Fine Art from Central Saint Martins in 2007

He also writes and produces music under the name ¥ANG and has released eight singles and one EP since October 2019.

References

Ben Young, Happy Nihilism, Review by Jean-Paul Gavard-Perret, Le Musée Privé, June 2011, Paris, France
Kontrapunkte, Review by Marianne Mühlemann, Der Bund, 30/06/2011, Bern, Switzerland
Le Sujet Irrationel de Ben Young, Interview by Christine de Schaetzen, H Art Magazine #57, October 2009, Belgium

Representation:

Atlantis Fine Art, New York

Website:

http://benyoungart.com

British artists
Living people
1973 births